Stand by You may refer to:

 "Stand by You" (Mai Kuraki song), 2014
 "Stand by You" (Marlisa song), 2014
 "Stand by You" (Rachel Platten song), 2015
 "Stand by You", a song by Anna Gjebrea representing Albania in the Junior Eurovision Song Contest 2021
 "Stand by You", a song by SKE48, 2018
 Stand by You, a 2021 television special featuring Miley Cyrus

See also 
 I'll Stand by You (disambiguation)
 Stand by Me (disambiguation)